Five More Minutes may refer to:
 Five More Minutes (Scotty McCreery song)
 Five More Minutes (Jonas Brothers song)